Linus' Beetle Bugs is an amusement ride themed to kids with a Peanuts theme and may refer to:

 Linus' Beetle Bugs at Kings Island
 Linus' Beetle Bugs at Valleyfair
 Linus' Beetle Bugs at Worlds of Fun